Suntan may refer to:

 Sun tanning
 Suntan (apple), a cultivar
 Lockheed CL-400 Suntan, a concept aircraft
 Suntan (1976 film), a Bollywood drama film
 Suntan (2016 film), a Greek drama film
 Project Suntan, a NASA project involving liquid nitrogen research